Alan Anthony Silvestri (born March 26, 1950) is an American composer and conductor of film and television scores. He has been associated with director Robert Zemeckis since 1984, composing music for all of his feature films including the Back to the Future film series, Who Framed Roger Rabbit, Forrest Gump, Cast Away, and The Polar Express. Silvestri also composed many other popular movies, including Predator, The Abyss, Father of the Bride, The Bodyguard, The Parent Trap, Stuart Little, The Mummy Returns, Lilo & Stitch, Night at the Museum, G.I. Joe: The Rise of Cobra, Ready Player One, and several Marvel Cinematic Universe films, including the Avengers films.

He is a two-time Academy Award and Golden Globe Award nominee, and a three-time Saturn Award and two-time Primetime Emmy Award recipient.

Early life and education
Silvestri's grandparents emigrated in 1909 from the Italian town of Castell'Alfero, and settled in Teaneck, New Jersey. He grew up in Teaneck, and graduated in 1968 from  Teaneck High School. He attended Berklee College of Music for two years. He was a drummer for a short time in 1966 with Teaneck-based rock band The Wildcats.

Career
Silvestri moved to Los Angeles in 1970. "I came to Hollywood in 1970 broke...I didn't even have any goals or plans. I didn't even go to movies. And I knew nothing about composers or composing," he said. In 1972, while he was working intermittently as a session guitarist, the producer of the low-budget action film The Doberman Gang asked him to score the picture. Silvestri agreed, despite a lack of experience: "I went out and bought a how-to-compose book by Earl Hagen... At one point I was using beer cans for percussion."

From 1978 to 1983, Silvestri was the main composer for the television series CHiPs, writing music for 95 of the show's 139 episodes.

Silvestri met film director Robert Zemeckis when they worked together on Zemeckis's film Romancing the Stone (1984). Since then, he has composed the music for all of Zemeckis's movies, including the Back to the Future trilogy (1985–1990), Who Framed Roger Rabbit (1988), Death Becomes Her (1992), Forrest Gump (1994), Contact (1997), Cast Away (2000), The Polar Express (2004), Beowulf (2007), A Christmas Carol (2009), Flight (2012) and The Walk (2015).

In 1989, Silvestri composed the score for the James Cameron-directed film The Abyss.  Since 2001, he has also collaborated regularly with director Stephen Sommers, scoring the films The Mummy Returns (2001), Van Helsing (2004) and G.I. Joe: The Rise of Cobra (2009).

Silvestri has composed the scores for four Marvel Cinematic Universe films: Captain America: The First Avenger (2011), The Avengers (2012), Avengers: Infinity War (2018), and Avengers: Endgame (2019). His themes and motifs from those films have been referenced and reprised by other composers in multiple other MCU films.

Silvestri has also composed music for television series, including T. J. Hooker (one episode), Starsky & Hutch (three episodes), Tales from the Crypt (seven episodes). In 2014, he composed the award-winning music for the science documentary series Cosmos: A Spacetime Odyssey. He wrote new songs with Glen Ballard for the live-action film adaptation of Disney's Pinocchio.

Personal life
Silvestri and his wife Sandra own a vineyard, Silvestri Vineyards, in Carmel Valley, California. He also has a wine tasting room for his vineyards on the ground floor of the Enchanted Oaks Building.  He has a daughter and two sons. A licensed pilot, he flies his own jet aircraft.

Awards
Silvestri has received two Academy Award nominations: Best Original Score for Forrest Gump (1994); and Best Original Song for "Believe" on The Polar Express soundtrack. He also received two Golden Globe nominations: Best Score for Forrest Gump and Best Song for The Polar Express.

Silvestri received an Honorary Doctorate of Music from Berklee College of Music in 1995.

He has also received nine Grammy Award nominations, winning two awards: Best Song Written for a Motion Picture, Television or Other Visual Media for "Believe" from The Polar Express in 2004; and Best Instrumental Composition for "Cast Away End Credits" from Cast Away in 2002. His other nominations were for Best Album of Original Score Written for a Motion Picture or a Television Special and Best Instrumental Composition, for Back to the Future in 1985, Best Album of Original Instrumental Background Score Written for a Motion Picture or Television, for Who Framed Roger Rabbit in 1988, Best Instrumental Composition, for "Who Framed Roger Rabbit Suite" in 1989, Best Pop Instrumental Performance, for "I'm Forrest...Forrest Gump (The Feather Theme)" in 1994, Best Instrumental Composition, for Avengers: Infinity War in 2018 and Best Score Soundtrack For Visual Media, for Avengers: Endgame in 2019. During the 2005 Grammy Awards, Josh Groban performed "Believe".

He has won two Emmys, both for Cosmos: A Spacetime Odyssey – Outstanding Main Title Theme Music and Outstanding Music Composition for a Series for the episode "Standing Up in the Milky Way".

He has won the Saturn Award for Best Music three times, for his scores for Predator (1987), Back to the Future Part III (1989/90) and Van Helsing (2004).

On September 23, 2011, he received the Max Steiner Film Music Achievement Award from the City of Vienna the yearly film-music gala concert Hollywood in Vienna.

Filmography

Film - 1970s and 1980s

Film - 1990s

Film - 2000s

Film - 2010s

Film - 2020s

Television series

See also
 Music of the Marvel Cinematic Universe

References

External links
 
 
 
Alan Silvestri at Soundtrackguide.net
 Castell'Alfero (Italy) country of Asti of which it is City Honorarium
 

1950 births
20th-century American composers
20th-century American conductors (music)
20th-century American male musicians
20th-century American pianists
20th-century classical pianists
21st-century American composers
21st-century American conductors (music)
21st-century American male musicians
21st-century American pianists
21st-century classical pianists
American classical composers
American classical pianists
American conductors (music)
American contemporary classical composers
American film score composers
American male classical composers
American male classical pianists
American male conductors (music)
American male film score composers
American people of Italian descent
American television composers
Animated film score composers
Berklee College of Music alumni
Classical musicians from New Jersey
Decca Records artists
Hollywood Records artists
Grammy Award winners
Living people
Male television composers
Primetime Emmy Award winners
Teaneck High School alumni
Varèse Sarabande Records artists